is a 1974 Japanese film directed by Kōichi Saitō.

It is a remake of the French film The Last Adventure (1967).

Plot
Two men released from prison and one man's girlfriend (Meiko Kaji) search for gold using a diving suit.

Cast
Ken Takakura as Jokichi Anabuki
Shintaro Katsu as Genzo Komagata
Meiko Kaji as Sakie
Ichirō Nakatani as Tappei
Hideji Otaki as Oba
Goro Ibuki 
Shingo Yamashiro as Yasu
Kenji Imai as Isokichi
Taiji Tonoyama as Tamezo
Noboru Ando as Senzo Hikawa

Release
The Homeless was released theatrically in Japan on 9 October 1974 where it was distributed by Toho.

References

Footnotes

Sources

External links
The Homeless at Midnight Eye
 

1974 films
Films directed by Kōichi Saitō
1970s Japanese films